Macrobrochis holosericea is a moth of the subfamily Arctiinae. It was described by George Hampson in 1901. It is found in western China.

References

Lithosiina
Moths described in 1901